Steve Soffa is an  American jewelry designer best known for his timepieces that are sold and distributed to Fortune 100 companies.

Biography

In 1993, Soffa started his career as a salesman at a branding watch company. A few years later, he was recruited by a Los Angeles Company to build their commemorative watch collection.

On April 23, 2005, Soffa launched Hardcore Watch Company brand at Laughlin River Run, Nevada and in 2008 at Rio All Suite Hotel and Casino, Las Vegas.

In 2010, Soffa became the official designer for the 2010 World Series of Poker. Designed and manufactured 74 tournament champion bracelets and world champion bracelet. Soffa became the first to design and introduce the special women's championship tournament bracelet.

In 2013, Soffa designed custom timepieces and jewelry for 13th year of Shriekfest, film festival and screenplay competition.

In 2014, Soffa he started a new division focusing on creating one-of-a-kind timepieces and jewelry for collectors who want their own collectibles and heirlooms.

In 2015, he became the official designer for the Sturgis 75th Anniversary Collection of jewelry and watches for Sturgis Motorcycle Rally.

In 2016, Soffa luxury Timepieces was an official sponsor of the world renowned Cannonball Run Rally.

Soffa and Scott Jacobs collaborated on a watch creation called Art and Sole and the most recent piece of artwork that was crafted in the art of time called For Your Eyes Only in 2018. In 2019, Soffa designed the trophy of the DeepStack Championship Event.

Awards
 In 2008, winner of JCK (Jeweler's Choice Awards) award for best watch design.
 In 2012, Gold Winner at PPAI National Branding Show for best technical design and complication for "Ace of Pain" timepiece (ART720)
 In 2013, Silver award winner at the PPAI National Branding Show in the category of Best Technical Design for "Twisted Love" ART700.

References

External links 
 WSOP Bracelet Designer Steve Soffa Interview Poker News Daily
 WSOP 2010: Making the Bracelet PokerNews

Year of birth missing (living people)
Living people
American jewelry designers